Palm Tree is a town coterminous with the village of Kiryas Joel in Orange County, New York, United States. New York's first new town in 38 years, it came into being on New Year's Day 2019 as the result of a referendum that came about due to zoning and other conflicts between residents of the village of Kiryas Joel, inhabited by the Satmar Hasidic community, and the municipality to which it belonged, Monroe. The population of Palm Tree was 32,954 at the 2020 census.

History 
The village of Kiryas Joel was created in the early 1970s at the behest of Satmar rebbe Joel Teitelbaum, whom the village was named for, as a semi-rural retreat for his Williamsburg, Brooklyn-based community. Over time, the need to annex additional land in order to accommodate Kiryas Joel's burgeoning population created zoning conflicts with the town of Monroe. These conflicts were eventually solved with a referendum, which passed overwhelmingly on November 7, 2017, that resulted in an amicable split from Monroe and the creation of the town of Palm Tree, which was to be coterminous with Kiryas Joel.

On June 14, 2018, special legislation was passed that moved up the target date by one year. The bill was signed by Governor Andrew Cuomo on July 1. The town became official on January 1, 2019, with officials elected in November 2018 being sworn in on that date. No candidates ran for town justice in the 2018 or 2019 elections, and Palm Tree remains the only town in the state without a justice court, as the law requires.

Etymology 
The name "Palm Tree" is a calque (translation) of the surname/family name of Joel Teitelbaum. In Yiddish, teitel means "date palm" and baum "tree".

See also 

 Kaser, New York − a majority Hasidic village in a neighboring county.
 New Square, New York − a majority Hasidic village in a neighboring county.
 Hasidic Judaism

Notes

References

Towns in Orange County, New York
2019 establishments in New York (state)
Poughkeepsie–Newburgh–Middletown metropolitan area
Jewish communities in the United States
Orthodox Jewish communities
Kiryas Joel, New York
Satmar (Hasidic dynasty)
Populated places established in 2019
Populated places established by Hasidim